The Colonel Patrick O'Rorke Memorial Bridge is a bascule bridge in New York, United States, that connects the Rochester neighborhood of Charlotte to the town of Irondequoit. He was killed in action assisting the defense of Little Round Top. The bridge carries Pattonwood Drive over the CSX Transportation-owned Charlotte Running Track and the Genesee River near its mouth at Lake Ontario.

The bridge was dedicated on October 2, 2004. It was maintained by Monroe County until November 26, 2007, when ownership of the structure was transferred to the state of New York as part of a highway maintenance swap between the two levels of government. It is now maintained by the New York State Department of Transportation as New York State Route 943F, an unsigned reference route.

See also
List of reference routes in New York

References

External links

Bascule bridges in the United States
Bridges completed in 2004
Buildings and structures in Monroe County, New York
Road bridges in New York (state)
Bridges in Rochester, New York
Metal bridges in the United States